Saint John Harbour is a large natural harbour on the Atlantic coast of New Brunswick, Canada, and within the seaport city of Saint John, New Brunswick.

Harbour description

The harbour includes the following geographic areas:

 Anthonys Cove
 Hazen Creek
 Courtenay Bay
 Round Reef
 Saint John River

Islands
The harbour is home to several small islands including:
Partridge Island
Navy Island

Navigation

There are two large bridges crossing The Narrows:
 the Saint John Harbour Bridge
 the Reversing Falls Bridge, opening in 1970

Port facilities
The harbour is managed by the Port of Saint John.

Pollution and harbor cleanup

The Saint John, New Brunswick harbour cleanup infrastructure project brought an end to the routine release of raw sewage into Saint John's waterways. The $99 million initiative involved the finishing of a third wastewater treatment plant east in the city, and redirecting of the existing outfalls to lift and pumping stations. The initiative received full funding from the municipal, provincial and federal governments in 2008 and the project was completed in 2014. 

Saint John had in the past discharged  of raw sewage into the Saint John Harbour and its streams on a daily basis. The practice had been ongoing in Saint John since the mid-1800s. Although Saint John was not the sole Canadian municipality to dispose wastewater that was untreated into the environment, it had been unique in that its outfalls once flowed into local streams, forming open sewers that ran through the city center. 

Guidelines suggested for Canada indicate waters with counts of higher than 200 fecal coliform bacteria per  sample cannot be touched by humans (including fishing, swimming, pet swimming and wading). Post-cleanup sampling done throughout 2014 along the creek's lowest  – which in the past had received the highest number of volume municipal wastewater that had not been treated – revealed a reduced amount of faecal bacteria counts between 95 and 99 percent from the year before. Although as of 2014 bacteria levels remained on average higher than the 200 counts/100  guidelines for federal recreational water safety for every site that was tested, and improved water quality. 

Previously, in several places, Harbour Passage walking trail in Saint John came close to outfalls that had contaminated the harbour with waste that humans could not touch. A University of New Brunswick study had also discovered the raw sewage contaminated fish in the waterways, causing handling to become a human health risk. Personal hygiene products such as condoms, tampons and toilet paper were sometimes seen on beaches and hanging from along the shoreline's vegetation. Those outfalls were decommissioned as part of the cleanup project.

References

External links
Saint John Port Authority - official website

 

Geography of Saint John County, New Brunswick
Ports and harbours of New Brunswick
Tourist attractions in Saint John, New Brunswick